Ciemino  (German: Groß Zemmin) is a village in the administrative district of Gmina Borne Sulinowo, within Szczecinek County, West Pomeranian Voivodeship, in north-western Poland.

References

Ciemino